Robert Ballaman (21 June 1926 – 5 September 2011) was a Swiss footballer who played as a centre forward.

Career
Born in Reconvilier, Ballaman began playing football with FC Reconvilier at age 15. in 1946, he joined FC Biel-Bienne, where he would win the 1946–47 Nationalliga A title. He played a total of 14 seasons in the Nationalliga A with FC Biel-Bienne, Grasshopper Club Zürich and FC Winterthur, scoring 271 league goals.

Ballaman earned 50 caps and scored 18 goals for the Switzerland national football team. He played in the 1954 FIFA World Cup on home soil, where he scored 4 goals and Switzerland reached the quarterfinals.

Club career
 1944–1950: FC Biel-Bienne
 1950–1963: Grasshopper Club Zürich
 1963–1964: FC Winterthur

Personal
Ballaman died at age 85 in September 2011.

References

1926 births
2011 deaths
Swiss men's footballers
Switzerland international footballers
1954 FIFA World Cup players
FC Biel-Bienne players
Grasshopper Club Zürich players
FC Winterthur players
Swiss Super League players
Association football forwards
Sportspeople from the canton of Bern